Kalililo Kakonje (born June 1, 1985 in Lusaka) is a Zambian former professional footballer who played as a goalkeeper. He serves as goalkeeper coach for Red Arrows FC in Zambia.

International career
Kakonje played for the Zambian national team since 2004.

Honours
Zambia
Africa Cup of Nations: 2012

References

Living people
1985 births
Sportspeople from Lusaka
Zambian footballers
Association football goalkeepers
Lusaka Dynamos F.C. players
Power Dynamos F.C. players
Lamontville Golden Arrows F.C. players
Nathi Lions F.C. players
AmaZulu F.C. players
Nkana F.C. players
TP Mazembe players
NAPSA Stars F.C. players
Zambia international footballers
Africa Cup of Nations-winning players
2008 Africa Cup of Nations players
2010 Africa Cup of Nations players
2012 Africa Cup of Nations players
Zambian expatriate footballers
Expatriate soccer players in South Africa
Zambian expatriate sportspeople in South Africa